Villefranque is a commune in the Pyrénées-Atlantiques department in south-western France. It is part of the traditional Basque province of Labourd. Villefranque station has rail connections to Saint-Jean-Pied-de-Port, Cambo-les-Bains and Bayonne.

Population

See also
Communes of the Pyrénées-Atlantiques department

References

Communes of Pyrénées-Atlantiques
Pyrénées-Atlantiques communes articles needing translation from French Wikipedia